Podhosta is a small settlement in the Municipality of Dolenjske Toplice in Slovenia. It lies on the right bank of the Krka River northwest of Dolenjske Toplice. The area is part of the historical region of Lower Carniola. The municipality is now included in the Southeast Slovenia Statistical Region.

References

External links
 Podhosta on Geopedia

Populated places in the Municipality of Dolenjske Toplice